Lorenzo Gelati (26 January 1824, Florence - 18 May 1895, Florence) was an Italian painter, primarily of landscapes.

Biography 
Gelati's father was a sculptor and his mother worked as a seamstress. Abandoning his liberal arts education to begin painting, he studied with Carlo Marco, who had arrived in Florence during the 1830s. Gelati expressed an early interest in landscapes and genre scenes. His first exhibition was in 1847. He remained a frequent and enthusiastic exhibitor throughout his life.

He also frequented the Caffè Michelangiolo, where he came into contact with the Macchiaioli. Although he never joined their movement, he was in accord with their use of color as it related to areas of light and shadow.

The scope of his work was often not appreciated as, after his death, many of his paintings—apparently unsigned—were attributed to artists such as Giuseppe Abbati, Raffaello Sernesi and Odoardo Borrani. The current locations of many of the works he sold in exhibition are not known.

References

Further reading 
 Biography by Emanuela Bianchi, from the Dizionario Biografico degli Italiani @ Treccani

 Silvestra Bietoletti, I macchiaioli: la storia, gli artisti, le opere, 2001, Editore Giunti

External links

 More works by Gelati @ ArtNet

1824 births
1895 deaths
Italian painters
Italian landscape painters
Painters from Florence